Fantastic Girls is the fourth Japanese studio album and seventh overall studio album release by South Korean girl group Kara on August 28, 2013, by Universal Sigma. This marks their final Japanese album featuring Jung Nicole and Kang Jiyoung.

Background
Details surrounding the album were accidentally leaked by a South Korean music store, who listed the album on their website before Universal Sigma had announced it. On July 29, 2013, Universal Sigma announced that Kara would be releasing a fourth Japanese album in August. It was announced that the album would be released in three editions.

Editions
Regular CD Only includes the first press edition includes a bonus track, "Happy Happy Love." CD+DVD Type A includes a DVD featuring footage of the group's Japanese fan meeting "Kamilia School," held at Yokohama Arena on June 23, 2013. CD+DVD Type B includes a DVD featuring the group's U-Express live performance on March 2, 2013.

Singles
Two songs from the album were released as singles.

The first single, "Bye Bye Happy Days!", was released on March 27, 2013. The single debuted at number three on Oricon'''s daily singles chart selling 25,552 physical copies. By the end of the week, the single had risen to the number two spot on the Oricon weekly singles chart and sold a total of 65,588 physical copies. It debuted at number two on the Billboard Japan Hot 100 and Billboard Japan Hot Single sales chart. The single charted for 7 weeks and has currently sold over 78,000 copies in Japan.

The second and final single from the album, "Thank You Summer Love", was released on July 24, 2013. The single debuted at number two on Oricon's daily singles chart selling 48,479 copies, thus becoming the group's highest first day sales for a single. The single maintained its number two position and debuted at number two on the Oricon weekly singles chart selling 69,416 copies. "Thank You Summer Love" also debuted at number one on the Billboard Japan Hot 100 and Billboard Japan'' Hot Single sales chart, becoming Kara's second number one on both charts.

Track listing

Chart performance

Weekly charts

Year-end charts

Singles charted

Release history

References

2013 albums
Japanese-language albums
Kara (South Korean group) albums
Universal Music Japan albums